Whina is a New Zealand biographical film about the life of Dame Whina Cooper. Written by James Lucas, James Napier Robertson and Paula Whetu Jones, and directed by Robertson and Jones, the film stars Rena Owen, Miriama McDowell and Tioreore Ngatai-Melbourne as Cooper in different stages of her life.

Plot summary
The movie chronicles the life of Whina Cooper as a Māori leader, husband and mother. These are interspersed with flashbacks of her leadership of the 1975 Māori Land March. The film begins with Whina and her family being embroiled in a land dispute with a Pakeha (New Zealand European) farmer named Bob Holland in their hometown of Panguru. Though Whina is arrested by the Police, a sympathetic Catholic priest named Father Mulder secures her release by pointing out that her father Heremia Te Wake built the church that he worships at.

During the 1930s, Whina and her first husband Richard Gilbert participates in a government land scheme aimed at Māori with encouragement of Māori Member of Parliament Apirana Ngata, who encourages Māori to preserve their culture while learning European knowledge and skills. Through hardwork and sound investments, Whina and Richard are able to develop their farm into a successful business. Whina clashes with the leadership of her Te Rarawa iwi (tribe), who do not tolerate her outspokenness and defiance of traditional taboo against women speaking in marae (meeting houses). While raising their two children, Whina tends to her ill husband Richard, who suffers from a cancerous disease.

Later, the New Zealand Government orders an audit of Māori land.  Due to their hard work and investments, Whina manages to secure a favourable report from the Native land consolidation officer William Cooper. Despite initially keeping a distance, Whina develops romantic feelings for William and the two have an affair. After Richard dies from cancer, Whina learns that she is pregnant with William's child. As a result, the two are forced to migrate to Otiria where they marry and start a new life. Whina's blended family expands to include William's children.

During the Second World War, Whina takes part in a tapu (taboo) lifting ceremony in Waitangi and becomes involved in the Māori War Effort Organisation, which raises funds for the war effort through hangi and auctions. Whina later returns to Panguru and reconciles with her estranged relatives. Whina and William build a new meeting hall where women are allowed to speak. However, her relationship with Father Mulder is strained when he denounces the traditional Māori wood carvings as idols. After the meeting hall is burnt, William dies from a heart attack.

In 1949, Whina and her family migrate to Ponsonby where they and other Māori migrants experience discrimination in obtaining housing and work. In response, Whina joins the Māori Women's Welfare League, which seeks to combat homelessness, unemployment and alcoholism within the Māori community. Under her leadership, the League embarks on an ambitious programme to improve Māori education and outcomes, and to lobby the Government through petitions and statistics. Despite the League's success in improving Māori well being, Whina is later forced to resign as President after other League leaders object to her not attending meetings and making decisions without consulting them. While living in Auckland, Whina also meets an apologetic Father Mulder, who concedes that Māori church attendance has declined since the churches are not meeting their needs

In 1975, Whina organises the Māori Land March with the goal of reclaiming confiscated Māori land and forcing the Government to honour the Treaty of Waitangi. She emphasises that the Land March is peaceful and takes a zero tolerance approach to alcoholism among marchers. The marchers march from Te Hāpua at the top of the North Island down to the New Zealand Parliament in Wellington. During the March, Whina overcomes her self doubt, ageing health, and some hostile opposition with the help of the younger marchers including her cousin Gabriel. The film concludes with archival footage of Whina presenting a petition and a memorial of rights to politicians at Parliament.

Cast and characters
Rena Owen as Older Whina Cooper
James Rolleston as Gabriel
Vinnie Bennett as William Cooper
Miriama McDowell as Younger Whina Cooper
Erroll Shand as Father Mulder
Tioreore Ngatai-Melbourne as Teenage Whina Cooper
Sarah Valentine as Elaine
Jayden Daniels as Cyril
Briar Rose as Stacey
Kali Kopae as Mira Szászy
Awa Puna as Pattie
Richard Te Are as Richard Gilbert
Marshayla Christie as Kare
Wayne Hapi as Heremia Te Wake
James Tito as Pita Te Wake

Production 
Whina was written by James Lucas, James Napier Robertson and Paula Whetu Jones, and directed by Robertson and Jones.

Initial production on the film began in the early 2010s. 

Initially, the film had a planned shooting schedule of only one month, however delays due to the COVID-19 lockdowns in New Zealand meant shooting took almost six months.

Release 
The film debuted on 23 June 2022 in cinemas across New Zealand on the eve of the first time Matariki was recognised as a public holiday. Film stars attended a special charity screening of the film in Kerikeri on the same day. Cooper's granddaughter Irene attended the charity screening alongside cast-members.

Whina screened at the Sydney Film Festival in June 2022; Edinburgh Film Festival in August 2022; and the Adelaide Film Festival (AFF) on 23 October 2022. It was one of 12 titles selected in competition at AFF.

The film was released in Australian cinemas on 3 November 2022.

Box office

Whina was the fifth-best performing film in New Zealand during its week of release, and is  the second highest performing film of New Zealand origin at the New Zealand Box Office for 2022.

Reception
The film received positive reviews. It holds  on Rotten Tomatoes based on  critic reviews.

References

External links
 
 

2022 films
2020s New Zealand films
2022 biographical drama films
Cultural depictions of New Zealand women
Films about Māori people
Films set in New Zealand
Māori-language films
New Zealand biographical drama films
New Zealand historical films
2020s English-language films
Films shot in New Zealand
Films directed by James Napier Robertson